Marvin Jermaine Jones (born December 29, 1993) is an American professional basketball player for Hapoel Holon of the Israeli Basketball Premier League. He played college basketball for Highland CC, Kent State and Texas Southern.

High school career
Jones played high school basketball at Thornton Township High School in Harvey, Illinois under head coach Troy Jackson. Jones was named to the NWI Times Illinois All-Area honorable mention honors as a senior and helped the Wildcats capture four consecutive regional championships. He also helped the Wolverines capture a state championship during his sophomore season.

College career
As a freshman at Highland Community College, Jones averaged 1.6 points and 1.8 rebounds per game. As a sophomore, he earned NJCAA First Team All-Region IV honors after leading Highland to a 27-8 record and NJCAA Di National Tournament berth. He led the Cougars with 7.9 rebounds and 1.9 blocks per game while scoring 9.0 points per game and shooting 57.9% from the field. On 2014, Jones transferred to Kent State. With Kent State, he played in 27 games with one start and in 8.8 minutes he averaged 1.7 points and 1.9 rebounds per game with a total of seven blocks and four assists on the season. The following season he again transferred, to Texas Southern where he averaged 8.5 points, 6.8 rebounds, and 1.6 blocks per game, and at the end of the season, he was the SWAC Tournament MVP and the SWAC Defensive Player of the Year.

Professional career
After going undrafted in the 2017 NBA draft, Jones joined Kolossos Rodou of the Greek Basket League. With Kolossos, he went on to average 10.4 points, 6.2 rebounds, and 1 block per game.

On June 15, 2018, he signed a two-year deal with Slovenian club Olimpija.

On January 28, 2020, Jones returned to Greece and signed with EuroCup club Promitheas Patras.

On July 17, 2020, he moved to BCL club Peristeri, also of the Greek Basket League. Jones was named player of the week on November 17, after posting 19 points adding eight rebounds for Peristeri in a victory against Charilaos Trikoupis. In 31 games overall with Peristeri, he averaged 9.1 points and 6.9 rebounds per contest.

On July 28, 2021, Jones signed a one-year contract with PAOK, his fourth Greek Basket League club. On March 19, 2022, he parted ways with the team. In 13 Greek Basket League games, Jones averaged a career-high of 15.7 points (shooting with 62% from the field), as well as 7.6 rebounds per contest.

On March 19, 2022, Jones signed with Leones de Ponce of the BSN. He averaged 9.6 points, 6.2 rebounds, and 1.4 blocks (7th in the league) per game.

On July 22, 2022, he signed with Hapoel Holon of the Israeli Basketball Premier League.

References

External links
ESPN.com Profile
RealGM.com Profile

1993 births
Living people
People from Harvey, Illinois
Sportspeople from Cook County, Illinois
ABA League players
American expatriate basketball people in Greece
American expatriate basketball people in Slovenia
American men's basketball players
Basketball players from Illinois
Centers (basketball)
Hapoel Holon players
Junior college men's basketball players in the United States
Kent State Golden Flashes men's basketball players
KK Olimpija players
KK Krka players
Kolossos Rodou B.C. players
Leones de Ponce basketball players
P.A.O.K. BC players
Peristeri B.C. players
Petkim Spor players
Power forwards (basketball)
Promitheas Patras B.C. players
Texas Southern Tigers men's basketball players